The 2015 KNSB Dutch Sprint Championships in speed skating were held in Groningen at the Sportcentrum Kardinge from 17 January to 18 January 2015. The tournament was part of the 2014–2015 speed skating season. Hein Otterspeer and Thijsje Oenema won the sprint titles.

Schedule

Medalist

Men's sprint

Women's sprint

Classification

Men's sprint

Women's sprint

Source:

References

KNSB Dutch Sprint Championships
KNSB Dutch Sprint Championships
2015 Sprint